The strange weaver (Ploceus alienus) is a species of bird in the family Ploceidae.
It is found in the Albertine Rift montane forests.

References

External links
 Strange weaver -  Species text in Weaver Watch.

strange weaver
Birds of Central Africa
strange weaver
Taxonomy articles created by Polbot